Jowai Polytechnic was established in 2002, by the Government of Meghalaya, as a polytechnic college. It is an AICTE recognised college and currently offers diplomas in 3 disciplines.

Campus
The college is located at Ladthadlaboh, Jowai in a sprawling campus. The campus includes the main academic building and the labs. Also it has the residential quarters for the faculty and staffs and hostels for the students.

Diplomas courses offered
The college currently offers diplomas in 3 disciplines.
Costume Design & Garment Technology
Automobile Engineering
Architectural Assistantship

External links 
Jowai Polytechnic

Educational institutions established in 2002
Universities and colleges in Meghalaya
Engineering colleges in Meghalaya
2002 establishments in Meghalaya